Statistics of American Soccer League II in season 1938–39.

Metropolitan Division

Playoffs

First round
 Philadelphia German-American defeated Brooklyn St. Mary's 3–0
 Philadelphia Passon defeated Kearny Irish 3–0

Semifinals
 Kearny Scots defeated Brookhattan 4–2, 1–1
 Philadelphia German-American defeated Philadelphia Passon 3–2

Championship finals
 Kearny Scots defeated Philadelphia German-American, 3–2, 4–2

New England Division

References

American Soccer League (1933–1983) seasons
American Soccer League, 1938-39